Valta may refer to:

 Jiří Valta, a retired Czech football midfielder
 Hermann von Valta, a German bobsledder
 Välta, a village in Saaremaa Parish, Saare County in western Estonia

See also 

 Valtat
 Walta (disambiguation)